Lepadichthys is a genus of clingfishes native to the Indian and Pacific Oceans.

Species
There are currently 11 recognized species in this genus:
 Lepadichthys bilineatus  
 Lepadichthys caritus  - Pale clingfish
 Lepadichthys coccinotaenia  - Eye-stripe clingfish
Lepadichthys conwayi 
 Lepadichthys ctenion 
 Lepadichthys erythraeus 
 Lepadichthys frenatus 
 Lepadichthys lineatus  - Double-line clingfish
 Lepadichthys minor  - Minor clingfish
 Lepadichthys sandaracatus 
 Lepadichthys springeri  - Springer's clingfish

References

 
Gobiesocidae